Hopewell Presbyterian Church and Hopewell Cemetery is a historic Presbyterian church and cemetery located at 5314 Old River Road in Florence, South Carolina.  The two-story, frame, Greek Revival-style church was completed in 1842. It features a pedimented front gable end and two-story portico.  It is clad in weatherboard and rests on a brick pier foundation with brick infill. The cemetery, in use since the late-18th century, occupies a three-acre site where the original Hopewell Presbyterian Church stood. It contains a notable collection of 19th century marble headstones and monuments. Inside the cemetery is the church's early Session House.

It was listed on the National Register of Historic Places in 2000.

References

External links
 

Presbyterian churches in South Carolina
Protestant Reformed cemeteries
Churches on the National Register of Historic Places in South Carolina
Cemeteries on the National Register of Historic Places in South Carolina
Churches completed in 1842
Buildings and structures in Florence County, South Carolina
National Register of Historic Places in Florence County, South Carolina